Est 4401 to 4512 were a class of Mikado (2-8-2) tank locomotives which were designed for service on the Paris suburban lines of the Compagnie des chemins de fer de l'Est. The Est placed them in power class (série) 11s. On nationalisation in 1938 they passed to the SNCF, who renumbered them 1-141.TB.401 to 1-141.TB.512.

Origins
The Est's first class of 2-8-2T locomotives were introduced in 1911 with the construction of two prototypes, numbered 4401 and 4402. They were designed under the leadership of CME Louis Salomon, and built in the Company workshops at Épernay. They were followed by a further 110 locomotives, delivered between 1913 and 1917. An order for 50 further locos once thought necessary was never constructed because of the First World War. The class was built by four manufacturers in six blocks:

Description
These locomotives were two-cylinder simple-expansion engines, with Walschaerts valve gear. They had a Belpaire firebox and the exhaust was later replaced by a PLM three-ring type. They had carrying wheels at both ends, in Bissel trucks of "Est" type allowing lateral movement of ±90 mm. Only the driving wheels were braked. In the 1920s these locomotives were fitted for push-pull operation. This equipment has been removed from the preserved locomotives. Originally Nos. 4453-4462 were fitted with a "Caille Potonié" superheater which was later removed.

Usage and services
These locomotives made up the largest tank locomotive class on the Compagnie des chemins de fer de l'Est and maintained the suburban service for Eastern Paris until the electrification of the Paris - Strasbourg line in 1962, being allocated to Noisy, Paris-La Villette and Vaires sheds. After that date they replaced the 2-6-2T locos of class 1-131 TB on the Vincennes line. They maintained that service until the eve of integration of the line with RER line A on 14 December 1969.

In 1932, 4433 underwent smoke-deflector trials, which were not followed up. 4438 received double slide-valves, a trial also not followed up.

On the formation of SNCF in 1938, the class was renumbered 1-141 TB 401 to 512 (there were only 110 locomotives because 4411 and 4413 had previously been withdrawn), and 15 locomotives were converted for push-pull operation.

Some locos were leased to Chemins de fer et transport automobile in Provins, i.e. 1-141 TB 407, 447, 455, 457, 460 and 500, which ran in the valley of the river Voulzie between Longueville and Villiers-Saint-Georges and lasted until 1972.

Preserved locomotives
 4407, which became SNCF 1-141 TB 407 joined AJECTA on 4 March 1972 at the Longueville roundhouse, where she was restored by the association.

 4424, SNCF 1-141 TB 424 was preserved in 1999 by AAATV at Mulhouse. She was used by the Chemin de fer touristique du Rhin, which completely overhauled her boiler in 2009. In summer 2013 she was lent to La Vapeur du Trieux (Trieux Steam Railway) for the tourist line from Paimpol to Pontrieux

Notes and references
 Translated from the French language Wikipedia, July 2014.

Bibliography
 
 
  Alain Pillier, 141 TB 407, Loco ! Loco ! DVD, 55 minutes, ed. la Vie du Rail.

External links
 
 
 .  
 
  
  

2-8-2T locomotives
141.TB
Steam locomotives of France
Railway locomotives introduced in 1911
Standard gauge locomotives of France
004401
ANF locomotives
Passenger locomotives